Kawl Kawl is a rural locality in the South Burnett Region, Queensland, Australia.

History 
The locality takes its name from a former railway station, which in turn was assigned on 18 January 1917 and is an Aboriginal word meaning scrub magpie.

The Courier-Mail reported on 30 April 1937 that "A cyclonic storm at Kawl Kawl station, on the Proston railway, on Wednesday night, was accompanied by
heavy hail, and 2in. of rain fell in a quarter of an hour. Mr. W. Peters's residence was unroofed, and all the windows were smashed in Mr. A. Marquardt's premises. Large trees were uprooted, and crops flattened".

Children living in the Kawl Kawl area attended primary school at either Mondure State School or Keysland State School.

References 

South Burnett Region
Localities in Queensland